Barnaby Jones is an American detective television series starring Buddy Ebsen as a formerly retired investigator and Lee Meriwether as his  widowed daughter-in-law, who run a private detective firm in Los Angeles, California. The show was originally introduced as a midseason replacement on the CBS network and ran from 1973 to 1980. Halfway through the series' run, Mark Shera was added to the cast as a much younger cousin of Ebsen's character, who eventually joined the firm.

Barnaby Jones was produced by QM Productions (with Woodruff Productions in the final two seasons). It had the second-longest QM series run (seven and a half seasons), following the nine years of The F.B.I.. The series followed the characteristic Quinn Martin episode format with commercial breaks dividing each episode into four "acts," concluding with an epilogue. The opening credits were narrated by Hank Simms.

The first episode of the show, "Requiem for a Son", featured a crossover with another QM program, Cannon, with William Conrad guest-starring as detective Frank Cannon. There was another crossover between the two programs in the 1975 two-part episode "The Deadly Conspiracy".

Plot

After Barnaby Jones (Buddy Ebsen) had worked as a private eye for many years, he decided to retire and left the business to his son Hal. When Hal was murdered while working on a case, Barnaby came out of retirement to find the killer. After this case, his widowed daughter-in-law, Betty Jones (Lee Meriwether), went to work for him at the detective agency. Jones was unusual, ordering milk in restaurants and bars, counter to the stereotypical hard-drinking detective.

In 1976, the character of Jedediah Romano "J.R." Jones (Mark Shera), the son of Barnaby's cousin, joined the show. He had come from Chicago to try to solve the murder of his father, who was a retired police officer. After that case was closed, he stayed in Los Angeles to help Barnaby and Betty, while also attending law school. Initially a somewhat angry young man, J.R. soon became an easygoing, fun-loving character.

Besides the Joneses, the only other recurring character on the show was their police contact, Lt. John Biddle (John Carter). He was introduced in the latter half of the second season and appeared in most episodes thereafter, though often only briefly.

As Ebsen aged and expressed an interest in slowing down a bit, Meriwether's and Shera's characters became more prominent, allowing Ebsen to reduce his role. During the last two seasons, episodes were divided evenly between the two actors, Meriwether and Shera each being the focus of half of the season's episodes with Ebsen's involvement limited to slightly more than episodic cameos. Ratings went up in the sixth and seventh seasons, after Shera's character was added, but they plummeted during Season 8.

The show was canceled in 1980 due to declining ratings; Ebsen had also tired of playing the role. After the series' cancellation, reruns aired in syndication.

Cast

Main cast
 Buddy Ebsen as Barnaby Jones
 Lee Meriwether as Betty Jones
 Mark Shera as J. R. Jones (seasons 5–8)
 John Carter as Lt. John Biddle (recurring role)

Guest stars
Among the guest stars who appeared over the years were Conlan Carter and Gary Lockwood, who appeared together in the third episode of the series entitled "Sunday: Doomsday" on February 25, 1973. Other guests in the first season alone included:

 Claude Akins
 Richard Anderson
 Meredith Baxter
 Carl Betz
 Bill Bixby (Meriwether's real-life ex-classmate)
 Geraldine Brooks
 Richard Bull
 Darlene Carr
 Jack Cassidy
 Dabney Coleman
 Jackie Coogan
 Glenn Corbett
 Cathy Lee Crosby
 Meg Foster
 Robert Foxworth
 Anne Francis
 Lynda Day George
 Richard Hatch
 James Hong
 Claudia Jennings
 Lenore Kasdorf
 Margot Kidder
 Geoffrey Lewis
 Ida Lupino
 George Maharis
 Nora Marlowe
 Kenneth Mars
 Roddy McDowall
 Claudette Nevins
 Leslie Nielsen
 Nick Nolte
 Don Porter
 Stefanie Powers
 Robert Reed
 Janice Rule
 Wayne Rogers
 William Shatner
 Joan Tompkins
 Lurene Tuttle
 Jessica Walter
 Michael Zaslow

In later seasons, guest stars included Wayne Maunder, formerly on CBS's Lancer western series, and Ron Hayes, who played Sheriff Oscar Hamlin in the episode "Target for a Wedding." Marshall Colt, later cast with James Arness on McClain's Law, guest-starred in two episodes in 1979. Donald May played the role of Curt Phillips in the 1978 episode "Blind Jeopardy". Character actress Lurene Tuttle  played Emily Carter, Betty's aunt, in the 1980 episode "The Killin' Cousin".

Many familiar actors made guest appearances, and others who were newcomers went on to become well-known, including:

 Jonathan Banks
 Susan Dey
 John de Lancie
 Gail Edwards
 Shelley Fabares
 Morgan Fairchild
 Ed Flanders
 Jonathan Frakes
 Mark Goddard
 Larry Hagman
 Ed Harris
 Linda Harrison
 David Hedison
 Don Johnson
 Tommy Lee Jones
 Don Keefer
 Vera Miles
 Patrick O'Neal
 Sean Penn
 John Ritter
 Madeleine Stowe
 Susan Sullivan
 Daniel J. Travanti
 Joan Van Ark
 Carl Weathers
 Robert Webber
 Eve McVeagh
 James Woods
 Simon Scott

Buddy Ebsen's real-life daughter, Bonnie Ebsen, made guest appearances in six episodes, while Lee Meriwether's real-life daughter, Kyle Aletter-Oldham, made cameo appearances in two episodes. Future Trapper John, M.D. stars Pernell Roberts, Gregory Harrison, and Charles Siebert all made guest appearances on one episode. Future WKRP in Cincinnati stars Loni Anderson and Gary Sandy made guest appearances, as well.

Episodes

Reception

Home media
On February 16, 2010, CBS DVD (distributed by Paramount) released season one of Barnaby Jones on DVD in Region 1 for the first time. The episode "The Murdering Class" has had the word "nigger" bleeped out when one of the characters speaks, although one can still hear the "n" sound of the word; because of this audio edit, the release was not called "The Complete First Season". The episodes on the DVD include their broadcast trailers.  This edit also exists on the VEI release.

As of September 2014, this release has been discontinued and is out of print.

On May 4, 2015, Visual Entertainment announced it had acquired the rights to the series in Region 1.  It was subsequently announced that VEI would release Barnaby Jones—The Complete Collection on DVD on December 15, 2015.  The 45-disc set features all 179 episodes of the series as well as a bonus prequel episode.

In other media

Film
During the mid-1990s, Meriwether and Shera expressed interest in a Barnaby Jones reunion television movie, but could not talk Ebsen into joining the project. However, in 1993, Ebsen reprised the role of Barnaby Jones in the film The Beverly Hillbillies, adapted from Ebsen's television series of the same name (Jim Varney played Jed Clampett, the role that Ebsen had played on the television series, in the film). It was Ebsen's final theatrical appearance.

Reruns
Beginning September 3, 2019, MeTV began broadcasting Barnaby Jones reruns.

Notes

External links
 
 Absolute Barnaby
 Barnaby Jones  –  Crime Drama TV Series of the Seventies

CBS original programming
Jones, Barnaby
Television shows set in Los Angeles
Television series by CBS Studios
1970s American crime television series
1980s American crime television series
1970s American mystery television series
1980s American mystery television series
1973 American television series debuts
1980 American television series endings
English-language television shows
American detective television series
Films scored by Laurence Rosenthal